Villammare is a southern Italian village and the only hamlet (frazione) of Vibonati, a municipality in the province of Salerno, Campania. As of 2009 its population was of 1,024.

History
Anciently named Petrasia, the village has developed urbanistically in 1950's due to sea tourism.

Geography
Villammare is located in southern Cilento, on the Gulf of Policastro, few km to the borders of Basilicata. It stretches along the Cilentan Coast, by the Tyrrhenian Sea, between the nearby village of Capitello (3 km far) and the town of Sapri (4 km). It is 3 km far from Vibonati, 4,5 from Ispani, 6 from Policastro and 11 from Tortorella.

Crossed by the national highway SS18 in north, parallel to the railway line linking Naples and Salerno to Reggio Calabria, Villammare had a minor train station, named "Vibonati", closed in 2002.

Culture
From 2002 the village hosts a short film festival for newcomer directors, named Villammare Film Festival, or Mediterraneoincorto. It takes place in the first week of September in the square Maria Santissima di Portosalvo.

See also
Cilentan dialect
Cilento and Vallo di Diano National Park

References

External links

 Villammare official website

Frazioni of the Province of Salerno
Coastal towns in Campania
Localities of Cilento